Brephidium pseudofea, the eastern pygmy-blue, is a species of blue in the butterfly family Lycaenidae. It is found in the southern United States, typically in coastal saltmarshes.

Subspecies
These two subspecies belong to the species Brephidium pseudofea:
 Brephidium pseudofea insularis Pavulaan & Gatrelle, 1999
 Brephidium pseudofea pseudofea (Morrison, 1873)

Biology
In Georgia, the eastern pygmy-blue is the smallest butterfly, where it lives along coastal portions of southeastern Georgia. It is a blue butterfly with a row of four silvery black spots along the ventral hindwing margin. Adults have a low, weak flight pattern and flutter just above the surface of host plants. Adults appear from May to August.

References

Brephidium
Articles created by Qbugbot